The Caribbean American Heritage Awards (CARAH) were established in 1994 to recognize and celebrate individuals "who have made outstanding contributions to American society, promoted Caribbean culture and interests in the United States, as well as to friends of the Caribbean." The annual awards ceremony is hosted by the Institute of Caribbean Studies in Washington, D.C..

For the first time since its inception, the 2020 awards ceremony was held virtually. Although initially announced as an awardee, musician Buju Banton was omitted from the 2020 awards. It was widely speculated that the organization rescinded the award after Banton spoke out against mask wearing during the COVID-19 pandemic.

Marcus Garvey Lifetime Achievement Award 
The Marcus Garvey Lifetime Achievement Award recognizes individuals of Caribbean or Caribbean-American descent who have been instrumental in the development or creation of an essential facet of Caribbean culture. In 2021, Jamaican sculptor Basil Watson received this prestigious award. Previous recipients are listed below:

 2020: Judy Mowatt from Jamaica was recognized for her "significant impact on the reggae scene"
 2019: Jamaican businessman and philanthropist Michael Lee-Chin, O.J. 
 2018: Jamaican actor, playwright and comedian Oliver Samuels, O.D. was recognized for his body of work in the performing arts
 2017: Jamaican scientist and philanthropist Hon. Henry Lowe, O.J., Ph.D.
 2016: Dr. Gerard Alphonse of Haiti, an electrical engineer, research scientist and prolific inventor
 2013: Freddie McGregor, a Jamaican pioneer in ska and reggae music, was awarded for his accomplishments

Other notable awardees 

 CEO of GraceKennedy Group Don Wehby received the award for Outstanding Corporate Citizenship in 2020, the first CARAH award of its kind.
 Olympian Shelly-Ann Fraser-Pryce was recognized in 2020 for her achievements in track and field.
 Gramps Morgan, lead singer of Morgan Heritage, received the "Outstanding Contribution to Reggae Music" Award in 2019.
 Soca Artiste Machel Montano was recognized in 2016 for his contribution to soca music.
 International Reggae Artiste Maxi Priest was the recipient of the 2015 Luminary Award for his contribution to Reggae Music.
 Actress Cicely Tyson
 Reggae matriarch Rita Marley
 Susan Taylor, former Editor-in-Chief of Essence magazine 
 Olympian sprinter and world record-holder Usain Bolt received the Vanguard in sports award in 2009

List of recipients

Early years (1994–2010)

Recent awardees (2011–2021)

References

External links 
 Institute of Caribbean Studies

Caribbean